Natalia ("Natalya") Pankina is a Russian long distance swimmer. She was the first Russian woman who successfully swam the English Channel in 2007 in a time of 8 h 11 mins. She narrowly missed a medal in the 2007 World Championships, coming 5th in the 25 km open water event, just 10 seconds behind 3rd place.
As a 1st Russian Woman, Natalya won the Overall at FINA Open Water Grand Prix 2008

References

1983 births
Living people
Female long-distance swimmers
Russian female swimmers
English Channel swimmers